David Michael Oehler (January 2, 1938  February 2, 2016) was an American environmentalist and author. He was a proponent and designer of affordable and sustainable alternative forms of housing. He became well known for his appearances in episodes of Louis Theroux's BBC documentary series Weird Weekends (1998).

Early life
David Michael Oehler was born in Chicago on January 2, 1938, the son of Polly and Chet Oehler. He grew up in nearby Wilmette and had three sisters named Patricia, Gretchen, and Sioux. He graduated from New Trier High School but dropped out of college to pursue his writing career, then served in the U.S. Army before working on fishing boats. He then worked in gold mines in Alaska, joined the U.S. Forest Service, cruised around Mexico, and finally ended up in San Francisco, where he embraced the hippy movement and lifestyle.

Career
Oehler partook in the 1960s back-to-the-land movement. He lived on a 40-acre homestead in the Idaho mountains. He wrote numerous books and appeared as a university lecturer, as well as a TV and radio guest, on topics related to self-sufficiency and housing.

In 1998, Oehler appeared in an episode of Louis Theroux's BBC documentary series Weird Weekends, in which Theroux visited Oehler's underground home in the mountains. Later that year, he appeared in the follow-up special episode "Weird Christmas", in which he and three others who had appeared in their own episodes (a Christian fundamentalist, a porn star, and a ufologist) met up with Theroux in New York and engaged in various activities. The episode saw Oehler being taken by Theroux to a recording studio, where he recorded a song under the stage name of Mountain Mike.

Death 
On February 2, 2016, at the age of 78, Oehler died of natural causes at his home near Bonners Ferry in Boundary County, Idaho.

Bibliography
 1981: One Mexican Sunday
 1982: The $50 Dollars and Up Underground House Book
 1999: The Hippy Survival Guide to Y2K
 2007: The Earth-sheltered Solar Greenhouse Book: How to Build an Energy Free Year-round Greenhouse

See also
Off-the-grid
Permaculture
Survivalism

References

External links
Oehler's underground house website
'Permies' permaculture website and forum

1938 births
2016 deaths
American non-fiction environmental writers
Organic gardeners
People from Bonners Ferry, Idaho
Permaculturalists